Ouea may refer to:

Oued Ouea, a town in the Tadjourah region of Djibouti
Wea, a town in the Arta region of Djibouti